Kamini is a village in Mummidivaram Mandal, Dr. B.R. Ambedkar Konaseema district in the state of Andhra Pradesh in India.

Geography 

Demographics 
 India census, Kamini had a population of 1020, out of which 508 were male and 512 were female. The population of children below 6 years of age was 11%. The literacy rate of the village was 76%.

References 

Villages in Mummidivaram mandal